Ara Damansara LRT station is a Light Rapid Transit station in Ara Damansara, Petaling Jaya, Petaling District, Selangor, Malaysia.

It is operated under the Kelana Jaya LRT system network as found in the station signage. Like most other LRT stations operating in the Klang Valley, this station is elevated.

The station has an entrance from the neighbourhood of Taman Mayang Emas near the Evolve concept mall, Japanese School of Kuala Lumpur, and another entrance from the Subang Airport Road which it faces.

Bus Services

Feeder buses

Other buses

External links 

Ara Damansara LRT station

Kelana Jaya Line
Railway stations opened in 2016